Me Mom and Morgentaler were a Canadian third wave ska band based in Montreal, Quebec. The band members included Gus "Van Go" Coriandoli, Kim Bingham, John Jordan, Adam "Baltimore Bix" Berger, Kasia Hering, Sid Zanforlin, Matt Lipscombe, Noah Green, Diane White, and John "JB" Britton. They were known  for their elaborate live performances, spectacles of vaudevillian-styled performance art with  leftist leanings. They sang in both English and French.

History
The band formed in 1988. They chose their name, with its reference to Henry Morgentaler, a doctor and pro-choice activist, before performing at a talent show at Marianopolis College where nuns worked.

In 1991 the band released an EP, Clown Heaven & Hell.  In 1993 they released a studio album, Shiva Space Machine,  and in 1994 a live album, We Are Revolting, was released.

The band broke up in 1996. Green went on to join NYC-based nerdcore hip hop band 2 Skinnee J's, taking the stage name J Guevara. Coriandoli also moved to New York, where he became involved in rock music production and opened a studio in Brooklyn. Bingham went on to a solo career, releasing an EP as Mudgirl before reverting to her own name for future releases.

Reunions
The band played a one-off reunion show at the Montreal International Jazz Festival in 1999, and later reunited in late 2007 for a series of four Montreal shows in support of the re-release of Shiva Space Machine. The new CD offered re-ordered, remixed versions of the band's classics, along with three unreleased live tracks.

Awards
In 2007 Me Mom and Morgentaler was presented with a Tribute Award at the Quebec Independent Music Awards.

Discography
 Clown Heaven and Hell (1991, EP)
 Shiva Space Machine (1993)
 We Are Revolting: Live & Obscure 1990–1994 (1994, live)
 Shiva Space Machine: Gone Fission (2007)

References

External links
Me Mom and Morgentaler on Myspace

Musical groups established in 1990
Musical groups disestablished in 1996
Musical groups from Montreal
Canadian ska groups
Third-wave ska groups
English-language musical groups from Quebec
1990 establishments in Quebec
1996 disestablishments in Quebec